Taufaʻahau Manumataongo Tukuʻaho (born 10 May 2013) is a Tongan royal, second in the line of succession to the Tongan throne.

Early years
Taufaʻahau was born on 10 May 2013 at Auckland City Hospital, the teaching hospital of University of Auckland in Grafton, Auckland, the son of Crown Prince Tupoutoʻa ʻUlukalala and Crown Princess Sinaitakala, during the reign of his grandfather King Tupou VI.

References 

2013 births
Living people
People from Auckland
New Zealand people of Tongan descent
Tongan royalty
Royal children